Hähnichen is a municipality in the district Görlitz, Saxony, Germany. Districts are Quolsdorf, Spree and Trebus. The church of Hähnichen, rebuilt in 1708/09, was first mentioned in 1436.

References 

Municipalities in Saxony
Populated places in Görlitz (district)